The Association of Personal Injury Lawyers (APIL) is a United Kingdom not-for-profit organisation comprising about 3,300 personal injury solicitors, barristers, academics and students.

The association was founded in 1990 by a group of barristers and solicitors who wished to improve the services provided for victims of negligence. Its four founders are Rodger Pannone, Michael Napier CBE, John Melville Williams QC, and Simon Walton.

Accreditation
APIL runs an accreditation scheme which assesses personal injury lawyers according to their expertise and experience. Lawyers who gain this accreditation kitemark have at least five years' experience of handling personal injury claims, and are known as senior litigators, fellows or senior fellows, depending on the amount of experience they have.

All APIL members are bound to abide by a code of conduct and consumer charter.

Campaigns
APIL holds regular meetings with Government ministers, MPs, civil servants and opinion formers on campaigns for reform in the law,  including:

 A campaign to deter motorists from driving too close to the vehicle in front in a bid to prevent low-speed collisions and whiplash injuries. At the centre of the Back Off campaign is an animation called "A Lesson In Social Graces".
 Lobbying for full and fair compensation for victims of workplace diseases.
Rebuilding Shattered lives is a campaign with a focus on putting a spotlight on the experiences of injured people. 
A campaign to reform the law on bereavement damages in England, Wales, and Northern Ireland.

Key aims
APIL’s vision is for a society without needless injury, but when people are injured they receive the justice they need to rebuild their lives.
APIL’s four strategic pillars are:
	Rebuild public trust
	Prevent needless injury
	Unsure prompt and full redress
	Drive excellence in legal representation

Structure
APIL is governed by 18 elected executive committee members.  The committee is led by a president, vice presidents, secretary and treasurer.

The current president is Neil McKinley.

References

External links
 

Organizations established in 1990
Non-profit organisations based in the United Kingdom
1990 establishments in the United Kingdom
Law-related professional associations
Personal injury